The Bocktschingel is a mountain of the Glarus Alps, located on the border between the Swiss cantons of Uri and Glarus. It lies south-east of the Klausen Pass, on the range east of the Clariden.

References

External links
Bocktschingel on Hikr

Mountains of Switzerland
Mountains of the canton of Uri
Mountains of the Alps
Mountains of the canton of Glarus
Glarus–Uri border